Empress Yuan may refer to:

Empress Yuan Qigui (405-440), empress of the Liu Song Dynasty, wife of Emperor Wen
Empress Yuan (Northern Qi), empress of Northern Qi, wife of Emperor Xiaozhao
Yuan Humo (? - 616), empress of Northern Zhou, wife of Emperor Xiaomin
Yuan Leshang (565 - ?), concubine of Emperor Xuan of Northern Zhou
The unnamed daughter of Emperor Xiaoming of Northern Wei (528 - ?), empress regnant of Northern Wei (not widely recognised)

Yuan